Palimino is a Wayana village on the Litani River.

Geography 

Notes

References 

Indigenous villages in French Guiana
Maripasoula
Villages in French Guiana